John Stuart Traill (born 1939) is a Canadian academic, author and founder of the Athenians Project. He is a graduate of the University of Toronto.

Works
 John S. Traill and Benjamin Dean Meritt. Inscriptions: The Athenian Councillors, 1974, 
 John S. Traill. The Political Organization of Attica: A Study of the Demes, Trittyes, and Phylai, and Their Representation in the Athenian Council (Hesperia Supplement), 1975,

References

Canadian classical scholars
Scholars of ancient Greek history
University of Toronto alumni
1939 births
Living people